Shelley Deborah Conn (born 21 September 1976) is an English actress. She is perhaps best known for her roles as Lady Mary Sharma in the hugely successful Netflix series Bridgerton, as Isabella in the film Love Sarah, as Dr Elizabeth Shannon in the Spielberg series Terra Nova and in Neil Gaiman's Good Omens and The Boys spin-off series Gen V, both for Amazon Prime.

Early life and education
Conn was born in Barnet in north London to Anglo-Indian parents. She is of mixed heritage, which includes Portuguese, Burmese and Indian. She attended Queen Mary's College in Basingstoke and Webber Douglas Academy of Dramatic Art. Conn trained at Bretton Hall. She was a student at Cranbourne School in Basingstoke.

Career

After drama school, Conn had a series of small roles in various British films, before coming to prominence when she starred as Ashika Chandiramani in the BBC series Party Animals. In 2001, she picked up the role of PC Miriam Da Silva in BBC1's Mersey Beat and an irregularly recurring role in Casualty. In 2002, Conn made her West End theatre stage debut in three plays in December 2002, after transferring from Stratford-upon-Avon in the Royal Shakespeare Company's Jacobean Season at the Gielgud Theatre – The Island Princess, Eastward Ho! and The Roman Actor.

Conn has appeared television, film and theatre, with a series of leading roles in various small budget European as well as British films namely BBC character dramas such as The Innocence Project, and occasional returns to the RSC. Conn joined Series Five of the popular BBC One series Down to Earth in 2004. In early 2008, Conn starred as Miranda Hill in The Palace, as Jessica in Mistresses and as Neela Sahjani in Trial & Retribution. In 2008 she appeared as Claire in Dead Set. In 2010 she played Danni Prendiville in the TV series Strike Back.

She was chosen by Steven Spielberg to be one of the leads in the $150 million TV series Terra Nova, which premiered on 26 September 2011. In 2014, Conn appeared in a US TV series called The Lottery. 

In April 2021, it was announced that Conn would star as Mary Sharma in the second series of the Netflix romance period drama Bridgerton based on Julia Quinn's second novel in her Bridgerton series, The Viscount Who Loved Me. The series was released in March 2022.

Personal life
Conn lives in London. She ran in the 2006 London Marathon. Conn married her boyfriend of over a decade, actor Jonathan Kerrigan, in late 2011.

Filmography

References

External links

1976 births
21st-century English actresses
Actresses from Hertfordshire
Actresses from London
Alumni of Bretton Hall College
Alumni of the Webber Douglas Academy of Dramatic Art
British actresses of Indian descent
British people of Anglo-Indian descent
English people of Burmese descent
English people of Indian descent
English people of Portuguese descent
English film actresses
English stage actresses
English television actresses
Living people
People from Chipping Barnet
Royal Shakespeare Company members